Rhynocoris albopilosus is a species of assassin bug in the Harpactorinae subfamily. This species, which is found in West Africa, exhibits a degree of male parental care, with males standing watch over females' eggs.

References
Bequaert J. 1935. Presocial behavior among the Hemiptera. Bul. Brooklyn. Entomological Society. 30: 177-191.

Reduviidae
Insects of West Africa